Anna Currence was CEO of Kitchen Bazaar from 1993 to 1995, before she was recruited to the President and COO spot at ailing Crown Books in 1997.  She assumed Crown's CEO position on January 12, 1998.  She was instrumental in the bankruptcy-emergence of the book retailer, though she left Crown in October 1998, just 1 month before it emerged from Chapter 11. After Crown Books, Ms Currence became an executive recruiter with Chicago-based Brooke Chase Associates Inc.

Previous to her executive positions, Currence worked for Barnes & Noble from 1973 to 1990, playing an instrumental role in their move from small-format stores to the superstore concept.

References

Additional Sources
 Crown Books - Employment Agreement Re: Anna L. Currence,  January 12, 1998
 "Crown Books Files Consensual Plan of Reorganization", Crown Books Press Release, July 1, 1999
 Crown Books Plan of Reorganization is Confirmed, Crown Books Press Release, October 7, 1999
 Crown Books files Chapter 11, unit closings inevitable, Discount Store News, July 27, 1998

Year of birth missing (living people)
Living people
American retail chief executives
American women chief executives
American chief operating officers
20th-century American businesspeople
20th-century American businesswomen
21st-century American businesspeople
21st-century American businesswomen